"Cross My Broken Heart" is the title of the first single released from Magic, the second studio album released by the American band The Jets. It also appears on the soundtrack to the Eddie Murphy film, Beverly Hills Cop II. The single reached number seven on the US Billboard Hot 100 in August 1987.

Music video
The accompanying music video features the group performing inside a soundstage, against a backdrop of a movie theater entrance. It does not contain any scenes from the film Beverly Hills Cop II; however, it shows stills of the group posing in front of the film's marquee. Eugene Wolfgramm is in the video, despite having left the group to form Boys Club. The video was the first filmed inside of Paisley Park

Charts

References

1987 singles
The Jets (band) songs
Songs written by Stephen Bray
1987 songs
MCA Records singles